Alfredo Carlos Mazacotte (born 17 November 1987, in Asunción, Paraguay) is a Paraguayan Association footballer who currently plays for Resistencia SC.

Career 
Mazacotte joined Club Sol de América before the start of the 2014–15 Paraguayan Primera División season after spells with Rubio Ñú and Nacional Asunción. He moved to Peru in 2015, joining Ayacucho FC.

References

External links
 
 BDFA Player Profile

1987 births
Living people
Paraguayan people of Italian descent
Paraguayan footballers
Paraguayan Primera División players
Club Sol de América footballers
Sportivo Luqueño players
Club Rubio Ñu footballers
Club Nacional footballers
Association football midfielders